The Barbados Black Belly is a breed of domestic sheep from the Caribbean island of Barbados. It is raised primarily for meat. Unlike most tropical sheep, it is highly prolific, with an average litter size of approximately 2. 

It is widely distributed, with populations in twenty-five countries in the Americas, Asia and Europe. It is most abundant in the Caribbean region, in Mexico and in Peru.

History 

In 1624, when William Courten arrived in Barbados, the only domestic animal on the island was the pig. By about 1650 sheep of two different types had been introduced, as described by Richard Ligon in his True and Exact History of the Island of Barbadoes: there were European wool sheep, which did not do well on the coarse pasture of the island, and hair sheep brought from West Africa.

It is widely distributed, with populations in twenty-five countries in the Americas, Asia and Europe. It is most abundant in the Caribbean region, in Mexico and in Peru.

In the United States the Barbados Black Belly has been cross-bred with Corsican Mouflon to produce the American Blackbelly, a distinctively-marked reddish sheep of small to medium size, which in males develops very large horns; the ewes are polled. There are  million of these in Texas, where many are reared as trophy animals to be shot by hunters. In 2014 the US reported  head of the original Barbados Black Belly breed.

The Barbados Black Belly has also been used in a cross-breeding project in Indonesia.

Characteristics 

The Black Belly is well adapted to tropical conditions: it has a high tolerance of parasites and is able to survive by grazing tropical grasses of poor quality, even in severe tropical heat and humidity. They are fleet of foot and in many ways resemble deer. It is a hair sheep, growing hair rather than wool.  Unlike most tropical sheep, it is highly prolific, with an average litter size of approximately 2. If raised in cooler climates, they often develop a wool undercoat that they shed in the spring.

Barbados Blackbelly sheep will breed all year round unlike most domestic sheep. Because they are smaller and slower growing than most wooled sheep, they are not a good choice for commercial production. However, there is a strong market for their lean and mild-flavoured meat, and they are popular with herding dog trainers. They are very disease resistant and parasite tolerant, and these genetic traits have created a demand for Blackbelly sheep in crossbreeding operations. These sheep can be raised with very little grain, and do not require intensive management. Blackbelly sheep range in colour from light tan to a dark mahogany red, with black stripes on the face and black legs, belly, inguinal region, chin, and chest, which gives this herbivore its name. Despite being goat-like in appearance, they are true sheep, even though they do look very similar to their wild ancestor, the mouflon, which also has short black and brown fur.

Crossbred and purebred sheep in Europe
In the 20th century, many Barbados sheep were brought from Barbados to the UK and mainland Europe, where it gained popularity. Due to the lack of mutual knowledge among hobbyists and sheep farmers, sometimes Barbados sheep are confused with Djallonké (Cameroon sheep). As a result, there are many crosses of these two breeds in Europe.

Some breeders mistakenly offer crossed and pure Barbados sheep as being Djallonké  (Cameroon sheep or West African dwarf sheep).

Crossbred and purebred sheep in Asia
Recently, there is successful attempt to crossbreed Barbados Black belly with Indonesian short tail local sheep, Suffolk sheep, and St. Croix sheep by Tista Waringin Sitompul, a teacher from University of North Sumatra, to create a new breed which called 'Waringin sheep'. Waringin sheep reportedly has shown desirable positive characteristics including it could reach weight about 150-200 kg consistently, prolificacy, and its worm based disease resistance

In 2016, Waringin sheep was considered by Rokan Hulu Regency regional government as local Government breeding project

Use 

The Black Belly is reared primarily for meat.

References 

Sheep breeds
Sheep breeds originating in Barbados
Mammals of Barbados